Vanacampus phillipi, also known as the Port Phillip pipefish is a species of marine fish belonging to the family Syngnathidae. They can be found inhabiting seaweed and seagrass beds along the southern coast of Australia from Perth to Jervis Bay, New South Wales including the coast of Tasmania. Their diet consists of small crustaceans such as copepods, amphipods, and mysid shrimps. Reproduction occurs through ovoviviparity in which the males brood eggs before giving live birth to 50 or less offspring.

References

External links 

 Vanacampus phillipi at FishBase
 Vanacampus phillipi at Fishes of Australia

Syngnathidae
Fish described in 1891
Taxa named by Arthur Henry Shakespeare Lucas